The Joint Task Force–Space Defense (JTF–SD) is a joint task force and subordinate command of United States Space Command. It is responsible for executing control of space defense and space domain awareness units to protect and defend U.S. space capabilities.

Mission
Joint Task Force–Space Defense's mission is to "conduct, in unified action with mission partners, space superiority operations to deter aggression, defend
U.S. and Allied interests, and defeat adversaries throughout the continuum of conflict."

Structure
Joint Task Force–Space Defense includes:
 National Space Defense Center (NSDC), Schriever Space Force Base, Colorado

History
Joint Task Force–Space Defense was established immediately after the establishment of United States Space Command on August 29, 2019.A ceremony recognizing the establishment of the JTF–SD was held on October 21, 2019 at Schriever AFB.

List of commanders

See also
Combined Force Space Component Command

References

Joint task forces of the United States Armed Forces
Military units and formations established in 2019
Space units and formations of the United States